Scribz Riley (born 25 August 1993) is an English Grammy Award-winning producer, songwriter, singer, and rapper from London, England. His real name is Michael Orabiyi, and he is sometimes credited as Mike "Scribz" Riley or Mike Riley. He is the brother of singer-songwriter Talay Riley. He has collaborated on Grammy-winning projects and worked with artists including Khalid, Cardi B, Kehlani, H.E.R, Kendrick Lamar, Chris Brown, Tove Lo, Ella Mai, and Wiley.

Early life
Born and raised in East London, Michael initially played the piano in church for his older brother, singer-songwriter Talay Riley. Later he began freestyling over grime beats while attending St. Bons Secondary School & YAP Youth Club. He also attended the Identity School of Acting, but gravitated to a music career instead. He was associated with Mucky Wolfpack, the E3 crew headed by God's Gift, meanwhile learning studio craft by attending sessions for the label Alwayz Recording with his older brother Talay Riley.

Career
His early credits included working with Rascals in 2012, with Wiley in 2013, and with Tove Lo as composer, producer, and keyboardist on her 2014 album Queen of the Clouds. In 2015 and 2016 he wrote and arranged for projects from Saygrace, and Julian Perretta.

In 2017, he composed and produced the track "Lights On" from on H.E.R.'s Grammy-winning self-titled album. He also composed and produced for Khalid's American Teen and Chris Brown's Heartbreak on a Full Moon.

His 2018 credits included production work on the track "Ring" from Cardi B's album Invasion of Privacy, which won the 2019 Grammy Award for Best Rap Album and was also nominated for Album of the Year. He also produced Zacari's song "Redemption" from the Black Panther soundtrack, which was also nominated for a 2019 Album of the Year Grammy.

On 25 May 2018, he was featured with Rachel Furner on the cover of Music Week's annual Hitmakers edition as one of "the next generation of superstar songwriters."

His May 2020 single "Impress Me" featured Headie One. His debut solo project was expected to be released Spring 2020.

Select discography

References

1993 births
Living people
English record producers
21st-century British male musicians
21st-century English musicians
British hip hop record producers
English male rappers
Musicians from London